Debenham is a village and civil parish located  north of Ipswich  in the Mid Suffolk district of Suffolk, England. The River Deben rises in the parish, and flows along a prolonged ford through the village.

In 1086, Debenham was a comparatively large village of 69 households in the hundred of Claydon.

At the 2001 census the parish population was recorded as 1,728 increasing to 2,210 at the 2011 census though including the parishes of Aspall and Winston. It is currently estimated to be 2,274.

In 1991 Prince Alexandre of Belgium was married in the village however the marriage was kept a secret until 1998. 

In November 2020, filming on the thriller movie Confession started at Debenham Church. The film stars Colm Meaney.

Village facilities
Village amenities and facilities include a post office, library, pharmacy, doctors' surgery, osteopath, a police station and fire station, cafes, a supermarket, a newsagents, green grocers, butcher, baker, florist and antiques dealer, and hardware and pottery outlets. There is currently one pub, the Woolpack; though it is hoped the Angel and Red Lion will be reopening soon.
St Mary's Arts Exhibition started in 1976 and runs each year during the summer. There is also a yearly fete on High Street.

Football
The local football club, Debenham LC is based at the village's leisure centre, and plays in Division One of the Eastern Counties League.

Schools
Debenham High School first opened in 1964 on Gracechurch Street and caters for 650 pupils aged 11–16. Debenham also has a primary school, Sir Robert Hitcham CEVAP School, for ages 5–11 on School Corner.

References

External links

Village website
Debenham Leisure Centre website
Debenham Family History website
St Mary Magdalene church (Anglican)
The Forge Community Church website
Debenham Arts Festival Website

Villages in Suffolk
Mid Suffolk District
Civil parishes in Suffolk